Veli-Pekka-Pekkarinen (born August 24, 1969) is a Finnish former professional ice hockey defenceman.

Pekkarinen played most of his career with KalPa, playing a total of 391 games for the team over twelve seasons, including 295 games in the SM-liiga.

Career statistics

References

External links

1969 births
Living people
Finnish ice hockey defencemen
Iisalmen Peli-Karhut players
KalPa players
People from Kuopio
TuTo players
Sportspeople from North Savo